The William Henry Seward Memorial is located along Main Street (NY 17A/94) in downtown Florida, New York. It commemorates the life of Seward, a Florida native whose career in public service culminated with his tenure as Secretary of State under Abraham Lincoln, in which capacity he negotiated the purchase of Alaska from Russia.

It consists of a bronze bust of Seward by Daniel Chester French, who also sculpted Lincoln seated at the Lincoln Memorial in Washington, set in the middle of a small circular plaza with benches designed by Richard Henry Dana III. Just behind it is S. S. Seward Institute, the local secondary school, named after Seward's father. It was unveiled September 24, 1930, and restored in 2000 after being added to the National Register of Historic Places the year before.

In 2007 the memorial was vandalized. Seward's bust was shifted and one of the benches cracked.

See also
 Sites and works regarding William H. Seward

References

1930 sculptures
Monuments and memorials in New York (state)
National Register of Historic Places in Orange County, New York
Bronze sculptures in New York (state)
Sculptures by Daniel Chester French
Vandalized works of art in New York (state)